Giant Steps (subtitled In Memory of John Coltrane) is an album by pianist Tommy Flanagan recorded in 1982 featuring compositions by John Coltrane.

Reception

AllMusic awarded the album 4.5 stars, with reviewer Bob Rusch stating: "This set was particularly inventive; it was Coltrane's music, but it drinks of its own spirit. You won't listen for the familiar Trane solos, but you will listen!" The Penguin Guide to Jazz wrote in 1996 that it was "one of the finest piano-trio albums of the last 20 years".

Track listing
All compositions by John Coltrane.
 "Mr. P.C." – 6:38
 "Central Park West" – 5:38
 "Syeeda's Song Flute" – 6:01 	
 "Cousin Mary" – 7:13
 "Naima" – 5:02
 "Giant Steps" – 6:14

Personnel 
Tommy Flanagan – piano
George Mraz – bass
Al Foster – drums

References 

1982 albums
Tommy Flanagan albums
Enja Records albums
John Coltrane tribute albums